You Call It Passion is a South Korean comedy film based on the novel of the same name written by Lee Hye-rin. It is about a new graduate who struggles to survive in the war of entertainment news.

Plot
Do Ra-hee (Park Bo-young) enters Dongmyung, a newspaper company, as an intern in the entertainment section. She soon discovers the dirty and hidden aspects of the journalism industry and learns the passion and enthusiasm of the press. She has to make non-existing news by corroborating stories. Her first assignment as an official journalist is to do a write up of a sexual assault scandal involving an upcoming young actor, Woo Ji-han (Yoon Kyun-sang), of a film studio JS. From her investigation of the new evidence of the scandal given to her for the write up, she found the evidence to be fabricated. So she told her boss, Ha Jae-kwan (Jung Jae-young) she is not going to do the write up. Her boss did the write up and post the scandalous article on their website. Later, from Seon-woo's (Bae Sung-woo) her ex-mentor suggestion she do a write up exposing the fabricated evidence used against the actor. The company refuses to use the write up. So, Ra-hee's colleagues assisted by posting the write up in the internet using public computers. This results in the arrest and prosecution of the film studio manager Jang (Jin Kyung) for corruption. The actor thanked her for clearing his name of the scandal. The movie ends with Ra-hee rushing out of the airport terminal where she send off her boyfriend Seo-jin (Ryu Deok-hwan) after receiving a tip off of a potential entertainment scoop.

Cast
 Park Bo-young as Do Ra-hee
 Jung Jae-young as Ha Jae-kwan
 Bae Sung-woo as Seon-woo
 Ryu Hyun-kyung as Chae-eun
 Jin Kyung as Jang, film studio manager
 Ryu Deok-hwan as Seo-jin
 Yoon Kyun-sang as Woo Ji-han
 Lee Kyu-hyung as Young-hwa
 Oh Dal-su as General manager Ko (cameo)
 Lee Byung-joon as Chairman (cameo)
 Jang Hee-soo as Ra-hee's mother (cameo)
 Lee Young-jin as Jae-kwan's sister-in-law (cameo)
 Kim Sung-oh as Section chief Ma (cameo)
 Hyun Jyu-ni as Reporter Hyun (cameo)
 Yoon Joo as Leisure control person (cameo)
 Ha Ji-young as Supporting

References

External links
 
 
 
 

2015 films
2010s Korean-language films
South Korean comedy-drama films
Films based on South Korean novels
Films about journalists
2015 comedy-drama films
Next Entertainment World films
Films directed by Jeong Gi-hun
2015 comedy films
2010s South Korean films